Songara or Songira is the name of a branch of the Chauhan clan of Rajputs.

References 

Rajput clans